Proterorhinus semipellucidus  is a species of gobiid fish, a tubenose goby originally described from  the Gharasu River near Gorgan Bay of the Caspian Sea in Iran. Following the systematic decomposition of the tubenose gobies it was suggested to be a more widespread and invasive taxon distributed in the fresh waters of the Caspian Sea basin. It may be the same species as that known as Proterorhinus nasalis.

References

External links
 Eschmeyer, William N. (2015) semipellucidus, Gobius. In Catalog of Fishes. California Academy of Sciences. (accessed 22 Feb 2015)

semipellucidus
Fish of Asia
Fish of Russia
Fish of the Caspian Sea
Fish described in 1877